Piano Improvisations Vol. 1 is the seventh solo album by Chick Corea, recorded and released in 1971 by the Munich based German record company ECM. It features solo performances on acoustic piano and was recorded over the course of two days in Oslo, Norway. These sessions also produced the subsequent Piano Improvisations Vol. 2. These two albums served as a bridge of sorts between Corea's experimental acoustic works in Circle and his more accessible work with Return to Forever.

Track listing 
All compositions by Chick Corea except as indicated

Original album:
Side A
 "Noon Song" – 4:00
 "Song for Sally" – 3:45
 "Ballad for Anna" – 2:25
 "Song of the Wind" – 3:10
 "Sometime Ago" (Chick Corea, Neville Potter) – 8:20

Side B
 "Where Are You Now? – A Suite of Eight Pictures -"
 "Picture 1" – 4:53 
 "Picture 2" – 2:03
 "Picture 3" – 2:30
 "Picture 4" – 2:40
 "Picture 5" – 0:32
 "Picture 6" – 3:55
 "Picture 7" – 1:55 
 "Picture 8" – 1:35

Personnel 
 Chick Corea – piano

Production
 Engineer: Jan-Erik Kongshaug
 Producer: Manfred Eicher
 Cover design by B & B Wojirsch
 Photography by Valerie Wilmer

References

External links 
 Chick Corea - Piano Improvisations Vol. 1 (1971) album review by Scott Yanow, credits & releases at AllMusic
 Chick Corea - Piano Improvisations Vol. 1 (1971) album releases & credits at Discogs
 Chick Corea - Piano Improvisations Vol. 1 (1971) album to be listened as stream on Spotify

1971 albums
Chick Corea albums
Albums produced by Manfred Eicher
ECM Records albums
Solo piano jazz albums